Cicadettinae is a subfamily of cicadas in the family Cicadidae. About 230 genera and 1,200 described species are placed in the Cicadettinae.

Tribes
These 14 tribes belong to the subfamily Cicadettinae:

 Aragualnini Sanborn, 2018
 Carinetini Distant, 1905
 Chlorocystini Distant, 1905
 Cicadatrini Distant, 1905
 Cicadettini Buckton, 1890
 Hemidictyini Distant, 1905
 Katoini Moulds & Marshall, 2018
 Lamotialnini Boulard, 1976
 Nelcyndanini Moulds & Marshall, 2018
 Pagiphorini Moulds & Marshall, 2018
 Parnisini Distant, 1905
 Pictilini Moulds & Hill, 2018
 Prasiini Matsumura, 1917
 Taphurini Distant, 1905

See also
 List of Cicadettinae genera

References

Further reading

External links

 

 
Articles created by Qbugbot
Cicadidae